= Rock the Spot =

Breakdancing event in London, Ontario, Canada

Rock the Spot, sometimes referred as RTS, is an annual b-boying event held in London, Ontario, Canada. The event attracts spectators and dancers from around Ontario as well as nearby areas such as Quebec, Michigan, and New York. The main feature of the event is a breakdance competition between crews however, there are often performances by specially invited dance groups which showcase funk or choreographed hip hop dance acts before or between rounds of the competition. Winners of the competition are chosen by a panel of special guest judges and prizes are awarded.

== History ==
Rock the Spot first took place on June 2, 2001, and was organized by Kyler Ayim (Bboy Ka Boom) and Matthew Kang (Bboy 12-Step). The original Rock the Spot was a success, however there was no event the following years until it was reinstated by main organizer Joseph Chen-Fu Hsieh (Bboy FoOL-Fu) and executive members of the UWO Breakers, a breakdancing club at the University of Western Ontario, in 2005.

The original organizers no longer have a major role in organizing the now yearly event, however, they have remained a part of RTS as the Master of Ceremonies (Ayim) and as a judge (Kang). Rock the Spot 2 and Rock the Spot 3 took place on March 25, 2005, and February 18, 2006, respectively, both at Huron University College at the University of Western Ontario.

Rock the Spot 4 took place on March 24, 2007.

== Winner Teams ==
- Rock the Spot 4 (2007)
  - Winner - ?
  - Runner-up - ?
  - 3rd place - ?
- Rock the Spot 3 (2006)
  - Winner - Stylordz (Hamilton / Toronto)
  - Runner-up - Poizon Applez (Syracuse NY, USA)
  - 3rd place - Ill Manners (Hamilton / Toronto)
- Rock the Spot 2 (2005)
  - Winner - Albino Zebrahz (London)
  - Runner-up - Stylordz (Hamilton / Toronto)
- Rock the Spot 1 (2001)
  - Winner - Albino Zebrahz (London)

== Participating crews in Rock the Spot 3 ==
- Poizon Applez Crew (Syracuse NY, USA)
- Wizards of Rhythm (Rochester NY, USA)
- Area 51 (Montreal)
- Da F.A.M. (Toronto)
- Illamentz (Toronto)
- DEFinity Crew (Toronto)
- Supernaturalz (Toronto)
- Guilty Bratz Krew (Toronto)
- UTM (Mississauga)
- Ground Illusionz (Mississauga)
- Illmanners (Hamilton / Toronto)
- Stylordz (Hamilton / Toronto)
- Dressed 2 Kill (Windsor)
- NEBC (Cambridge)
- Hungry Hungry Hippos (Sarnia / London / Toronto)
- Albino Zebrahz (London)
- Nomadz (London)
- Crazy Ghost Crew (London)

== DJs of RTS3 ==
- Sangua (Mississauga)
- Jazz-lo (Mississauga)
- Megabass (London)

== Judges of RTS3 ==
- FoOL-Fu (London)
- Mantis (USA)
- FloMaster (Bronx, USA)
- Pieces (Toronto)
- Mae Hem (Toronto)

== Performance Teams of RTS3 ==
- VyBE FX (Toronto)
- Hip-Hop Western (London)
- Funk Fantastic (Hamilton / Toronto / Waterloo)

== Special Guests of RTS3 ==
- K-Mel (Bronx, USA)
- FloMaster (Bronx, USA)
- etc. (info will be up soon...)

== Sponsors of RTS3 ==
- Tim Hortonz
- MTV Canada (Video coverage)
- Central Clothing

== Judges of RTS2 ==
- Bboy No-Way (London)
- Bboy Kee (Toronto)
- Bboy 12-step (London / Toronto)

== DJs of RTS2 ==
- Raiz (Hamilton)
- Mondo (Toronto)

== Performance Teams of RTS2 ==
- Fo' Real (Toronto)
- Grace (Waterloo)
- ScrambleLegz (Hamilton)
